Eino Jaakko Rytinki (27 January 1903 – 30 October 1972) was a Finnish smallholder and politician, born in Pudasjärvi. He was a Member of the Parliament of Finland, representing the Small Farmers' Party of Finland from 1933 to 1936, the Small Farmers Party from 1936 to 1941 and the Agrarian League from 1941 to 1945 and again from 1949 to 1958.

References

1903 births
1972 deaths
People from Pudasjärvi
People from Oulu Province (Grand Duchy of Finland)
Small Farmers' Party of Finland politicians
Small Farmers' Party politicians
Centre Party (Finland) politicians
Members of the Parliament of Finland (1933–36)
Members of the Parliament of Finland (1936–39)
Members of the Parliament of Finland (1939–45)
Members of the Parliament of Finland (1948–51)
Members of the Parliament of Finland (1951–54)
Members of the Parliament of Finland (1954–58)
Finnish people of World War II